Dadun11 is a shopping center located in Nantun District, Taichung, Taiwan. The mall started trial operations in January 2016 and officially opened on 30 April 2016. Main core stores of the mall include Carrefour, Hola, and various themed restaurants.

History 
 Dadun11 started trial operations in January 2016.
 Dadun11 officially opened on 30 April 2016.

See also
 List of tourist attractions in Taiwan

References

External links

2016 establishments in Taiwan
Shopping malls established in 2016
Shopping malls in Taichung
Buildings and structures in Taichung
Tourist attractions in Taichung